Knut Karlberg (born 19 September 1947) is a Norwegian veterinarian.

He was born in Oslo, and took the dr.med.vet. degree in 1981. He was hired at the Norwegian School of Veterinary Science in 1981, became professor of reproductional physiology in 1990, and served as rector there from 1993 to 1995.

References

1947 births
Living people
Norwegian veterinarians
Academic staff of the Norwegian School of Veterinary Science
Rectors of the Norwegian School of Veterinary Science